A Public Affair is the fifth studio album by American pop singer Jessica Simpson. The album was released on August 26, 2006 in the United States by Epic Records. The album is Simpson's first effort following her divorce from Nick Lachey.

The album was produced by Jimmy Jam & Terry Lewis, Cory Rooney, Scott Storch, Stargate and Lester Mendez. Simpson appears as a co-writer of nine of the thirteen songs on the album. A Public Affair received generally mixed reviews from music critics, who complimented its musical diversity from Simpson's previous albums, while also criticizing its length. The album debuted at number five on the US Billboard 200 with first-week sales of 101,000 copies. A Public Affair has sold 500,000 units in the United States and over one million copies worldwide to date.

Two singles were released from the record; the lead single "A Public Affair" became Simpson's sixth top-twenty single in the United States and her third song to reach number fourteen, tied with "With You" (2004) and "These Boots Are Made for Walkin'" (2005). 
The second and final single, "I Belong to Me", failed to chart on the US Billboard Hot 100, however, it charted at number 10 on the US Bubbling Under Hot 100. "You Spin Me Round (Like a Record)" was released as a promotional single. Her version of the song failed to enter the Billboard Hot 100, peaking at number twenty on the US Bubbling Under Hot 100 Singles chart. Simpson's version contains new lyrics and only preserves the chorus of the song.

Background and artwork

MTV first reported that Simpson's first album after her divorce would be released in late 2005.

Simpson was inspired by Janet Jackson for the album, saying "I do love singing ballads, but I took a different approach. I didn't do a big string-session type of ballad I'm used to." "I took more of a Janet Jackson approach. More of an 'Earth Angel' type of approach." Simpson contacted Jackson's main producers Jimmy Jam and Terry Lewis to produce several songs on the album.

With only a month to go until the release of A Public Affair, Simpson switched the cover photo of the album. The first cover art for the album surfaced showing a sultry Simpson with her hair down, sporting a dress with the straps pulled down. Ultimately, Simpson's representative Rob Shuter told TMZ the final decision on a cover had not been made by the time one had to be provided to Simpson's record label, so the first cover option (of three choices they had) was given. The original cover was ultimately not chosen, and Simpson went with the cover eventually released. The chosen album cover has a casual-looking Simpson "with nothing but a T-shirt on", her hair pulled back and wearing a ring on her right index finger.

Music and lyrics
Simpson said in an interview to a magazine, "A Public Affair" was an album that is a "fun night" with friends and not her failed marriage to Nick Lachey, although the first single was inspired by the rupture of the couple. The album opens with the first single "A Public Affair" musically, it is a moderate dance-pop groove song with disco influences. It also exhibits elements of pop rock and teen pop genres. The next song "You Spin Me Round (Like a Record)" is an updated version of Dead or Alive 1980s hit of the same name in the way Rihanna's "S.O.S." is a remake of Soft Cell's "Tainted Love", written by Pete Burns, Wayne Hussey, Mike Percy, Tim Lever & Steve Coy.
 The third track of the album, "B.O.Y." is an electro and disco song which features distorted synthesizers emulating sonar pulses, was written by Driscoll, Gagel, Ocasek. The fourth song "If You Were Mine" was tailored for the clubs and recalls Janet Jackson's "When I Think of You". "Walkin' 'Round in a Circle", the album's fifth track, is another song co-written by Simpson for the album. The song has a touch of Euro disco love song with new wave influences. The sixth track, "The Lover in Me" it is a mid-tempo pop song, contains instruments such as piano and guitar. The seventh track, "Swing with Me" a new rendition of Benny Goodman's 1938 classic "Sing, Sing, Sing". "Push Your Tush" the eighth track is a Euro disco song with disco influences. It relies heavily on a sample of the Ohio Players 1976 hit "Who'd She Coo?" "Back to You" track number nine, is a pop song with an urban influence, the song is one of the ballads on the album. "Between You & I" is the solecismic title of longest song on the album. "I Don't Want to Care" is another ballad about love, this time utilizing a piano. "Fired Up", the song title came from something one of Simpson's best friends, CaCee Cobb, always says: "Let's get fired up!". "Let Him Fly" is a cover of Patty Griffin's song of the same name. It is the final track on the album's original pressing. "I Belong to Me" was not included in the original pressing of the album, however, released as a Walmart bonus track. In September 2006, Simpson's label decided to release future pressings with "I Belong to Me" as a regular track. It was released as the album's second and final single.

Singles
"A Public Affair" was released as the album's lead single on June 29, 2006. The song received mixed reviews from critics, with many criticizing its close similarity with "Holiday". The song also channeled Janet Jackson with its "breathy vocals, cheery, almost sickeningly sweet melody", and "mid-song giggle". The music video features appearances by Christina Applegate, Christina Milian, Eva Longoria, Maria Menounos, Andy Dick and Ryan Seacrest. On July 19, Simpson visited Total Request Live to world premiere the video. In the chart Billboard Hot Videoclip Tracks peaked at the number 5. The single debuted at number thirty-nine on the US Billboard Hot 100 chart, Simpson's second highest debut after "These Boots Are Made for Walkin'". It had previously debuted at number twenty on Billboard's Bubbling Under Hot 100 Singles chart, which represents the twenty-five singles below the Hot 100's number 100 position that have not yet appeared on the Hot 100. Digital download sales were moderate until the release of the single's music video. In late July "A Public Affair" joined Ashlee Simpson's song "Invisible" in the top ten on the US iTunes Store's list of most popular songs, the first time in iTunes history that two siblings had different songs in the top ten. The song peaked in its fifth week on the Hot 100.

When the first official single was released, fans expected the official follow-up single to be club track "Fired Up". Weeks later, in an MTV interview, Simpson stated that "You Spin Me Round (Like a Record)" might be the second single from the album and that she would like to tour after three or four songs had been released from the record. However, on August 9, 2006, Simpson stated on her official website that she wanted her fans to choose the second single from the album; she provided five choices, which were: "If You Were Mine", "The Lover in Me", "I Belong to Me", "B.O.Y." and "I Don't Want to Care".

Simpson stated in a radio interview on August 23, 2006 that the second official single from the album would be "I Belong to Me". The album originally did not include the track "I Belong to Me"; Simpson stated that the track would only be included on a special version of the album sold exclusively in Wal-Mart. The track is also included on the iTunes version of the album. However, less than two weeks after the album's release, Simpson's record company decided to start shipping copies with "I Belong to Me" included; today, the album can be purchased anywhere with the bonus track included. Simpson mentioned that the album would feature a special code with which fans could download the song for free.

Jessica Simpson's version of the "You Spin Me Round (Like a Record)" was released as a promo single in 2006. Her version of the song barely made the Pop 100, and failed to make the Billboard Hot 100 chart, however, it charted to no. 20 on the Bubbling Under Hot 100, which is equivalent to no. 120. Simpson's version has new lyrics and only preserves the chorus of the song.

Critical reception

A Public Affair received mixed reviews in the press, including a two-star rating from Rolling Stone. The album was criticized for lack of originality, particularly its similarities to previous Top 40 pop and disco hits from the '70s and '80s, with few contemporary elements. The lead single "A Public Affair" was especially criticized for its similarities to Madonna's "Holiday", Diana Ross' "Ain't No Mountain High Enough", and Earth, Wind & Fire's "Let's Groove", but was favorably likened to Janet Jackson for its "breathy vocals" and "sweet melody". Bill Lamb from About.com stated: "The final 5 songs of A Public Affair are worth hearing for Jessica Simpson fans. I just hope fans can maintain their interest long enough to get there." Several songs on the album were considered "Janet Jackson-like," with "If You Were Mine" described as combining "the lyrics of "If" with the backing track from "When I Think of You". Sal Cinquemani of Slant Magazine regarded Simpson's work with Jackson's producers as unexpected, saying "Ironically, though, the tracks on A Public Affair produced by Janet's longtime collaborators, Jimmy Jam and Terry Lewis, aren't dance-pop at all; the duo's three contributions are, surprisingly, country-inspired."

Commercial performance

The album debuted at number five on the US Billboard 200, selling over 100,000 copies in its first week. However, total sales for the album ended up being disappointing, only selling 300,000 copies in the US. A Public Affair, was certified Gold by the Recording Industry Association of America (RIAA) for denoting 500,000 in shipments.

In Canada, the album debuted at number six, marking Simpson's highest position on the Canadian Albums Chart and was later certified Gold for 50,000 copies sold. A Public Affair also reached the top forty in Ireland and Australia, in the latter country peaking lower than In This Skin which reached number thirteen and was certified Platinum. To date, the album has sold one million copies worldwide.

Track listing

Sample credits
"A Public Affair" contains a sample from the composition "Ain't No Mountain High Enough" as performed by Diana Ross and written by Ashford & Simpson, the latter who were credited. 
"You Spin Me Round (Like A Record)" samples "You Spin Me Round (Like A Record)", written by Pete Burns, Steve Coy and Mike Percy and performed by Dead or Alive.
"B.O.Y." samples the opening guitar riff of The Cars' "Just What I Needed"
"Walkin' 'Round in a Circle" contains interpolations from the composition "Dreams" as performed by Fleetwood Mac and written by Stevie Nicks.
"Swing with Me" contains samples from the composition "Sing, Sing, Sing (With a Swing)" performed and written by Louis Prima.
"Push Your Tush" contains elements of the Ohio Players 1976 hit "Who'd She Coo?"

Personnel
Credits for A Public Affair adapted from AllMusic.

 Ron Allaire – engineer
 Chris August – backing vocals
 Xandy Barry – producer
 Magnus Beite – keyboards
 Louis Biancaniello – keyboards, mixing, producer, programming
 Jerry Brown – drums
 Ravaughn Brown – backing vocals
 Sherree Ford Brown – backing vocals
 Orlando Calzada – engineer
 Vince Cherico – drums
 Cacee Cobb – backing vocals
 Ian Cross – engineer, mixing
 Barry Danielian – trumpet
 Mikkel S. Eriksen – engineer, instrumentation, vocal producer
 Wally Gagel – engineer, instrumentation, mixing, producer
 Siedah Garrett – backing vocals, vocal arrangement
 Steve Geuting – assistant engineer
 Serban Ghenea – mixing
 Sharlotte Gibson – backing vocals
 Conrad Golding – engineer
 Tamyra Gray – backing vocals
 Keith Gretlein – assistant engineer
 Niki Haris – backing vocals
 Dorian Holly – backing vocals
 Paul Jackson, Jr. – guitar
 Jimmy Jam – keyboards, producer
 Justin King – guitar
 Greg Kurstin – guitar, keyboards, producer, programming
 Dan Kurtz – bass
 Abe Laboriel Jr. – drums
 Evan Lamberg – A&R
 Terry Lewis – producer
 Espen Lind – keyboards
 David Andrew Mann – tenor saxophone
 Matt Marrin – engineer, mixing
 Farra Mathews – A&R
 Chris Megert – vocal arrangement
 Ozzie Melendez – trombone
 Vlado Meller – mastering
 Lester Mendez – arranger, beats, Moog synthesizer, piano, producer
 Jessica Paster – wardrobe
 Ken Paves – hair stylist
 Dave Pensado – mixing
 Rafael Padilla – percussion
 Brett Ratner – photography
 Eric Rennaker – assistant engineer
 Makeba Riddick – backing vocals
 Tim Roberts – mixing assistant
 Reuben Rodriguez – bass
 Cory Rooney – drum programming, keyboards, producer, vocal producer
 Laurie Rosenwald – cover typeset
 Bobby Ross Avila – bass
 Andrew Rugg – engineer
 Dan Shea – keyboards, producer
 Jessica Simpson – vocals, executive producer
 Joe Simpson – executive producer, management
 Scott Storch – producer
 Phil Tan – mixing
 Mike Terry – engineer
 Tony Tolbert – backing vocals
 Valente Torrez – assistant engineer
 David LeVita – guitar
 Peter Wade – engineer
 Brian Warwick – assistant engineer
 Sam Watters – mixing, producer
 David E. Williams – guitar
 Joe Wohlmuth – engineer
 Lyle Workman – guitar
 James "Big Jim" Wright – keyboards
 Joe Zook – mixing

Charts

Certifications

Release history

References

External links
Jessica vs. Jessica

2006 albums
Albums produced by Greg Kurstin
Albums produced by Jimmy Jam and Terry Lewis
Albums produced by Scott Storch
Albums produced by Stargate
Epic Records albums
Jessica Simpson albums
Albums produced by Cory Rooney